Rampura Railway is a village in Mandi patwar circle in Phagi Tehsil in Jaipur district, Rajasthan.

In Rampura Railway, there are 44 households with total population of 392 (with 51.53% males and 48.47% females), based on 2011 census. Total area of village is 2.68 km2. There is one primary school in Rampura Railway village.

References

Villages in Jaipur district